HCL Connections is a Web 2.0 enterprise social software application developed originally by IBM and acquired by HCL Technologies in July 2019. Connections is an enterprise-collaboration platform which helps teams work more efficiently. Connections is part of HCL collaboration suite which also includes Notes / Domino, Sametime, Portal and Connections.

Overview
Connections was announced at Lotusphere 2007, and Version 1.0 shipped on June 27 that year.

HCL Connections has the following components:
 Homepage - a portal site which can federate information from many sources.
 Microblogging - primarily used to stay current with updates from across the social network through the home page
 Profiles - a social network service - primarily used to find people in the organization by expertise, current projects, and responsibilities. Home page, microblogs, and tags.
 Communities - a collaborative space for people to work together with a discussion forum space.
 Ideation - Provides the ability to crowdsource ideas
 Media Gallery - Used to share photos and videos and stream those videos from the server
 Blogs - a blogging service.
 Bookmarks - a social bookmarking service.
 Activities - a task management tool for groups of people to work together on a specific project or task.
 Files - a content library for storing, sharing and revision management of computer files.
 Wikis - a Wiki system for publishing and editing content.
 Forums - an Internet forum system where people can ask questions, share their experiences, and discuss topics of common interest.
 Search - for searching across IBM Connections.

At Lotusphere 2010, IBM previewed features being planned for future releases, including:
 changes to how user-generated content is moderated
 compliance/auditing capabilities
 additional integration with IBM WebSphere Portal and Microsoft SharePoint
 expanded mobile support

HCL Connections uses open standards including ATOM and RSS to integrate with other applications, and provides a REST-like API for developers. Widgets can be added into HCL Connections, including those from Google Gadgets and other services as well as custom developed ones.

HCL Connections has been described as the leading product in enterprise social software market and IDC named it the worldwide leader in marketshare in 2011.

Components
The ten HCL Connections components are built on a set of services according to the service-oriented architecture concept.  These components take the form of J2EE applications which are hosted on IBM WebSphere Application Server. This design allows the components to be hosted independently of each other and to support very large scale deployments.

Homepage
The Homepage serves as a portal for user's social collaboration. Out of the box HCL Connections provides 20 widgets which can be customized by the user.

IT administrators can add new widgets and OpenSocial gadgets for use by users.

The Homepage module also includes a 'recent updates' display which shows changes such as new content posts and status updates which are relevant to the user. A system to update the users status via microblogging is also provided.

Profiles
Profiles provides an online directory of people within an organization. People can be located by criteria such as keywords, names, responsibilities, interests, projects they are part of, expertise, business relationships, tags, or their location.

A person's profile typically contains their name, job role, base location, reporting chain and details about the IBM Connection bookmarks, activities, communities and blogs in which they participate.  Profiles can be customized and new fields added.

Bookmarks
Bookmarks is a social bookmarking service which allows people to bookmark web-content, tag it, and share it. Bookmarks can be located via keyword, tags and the person who created the bookmark.

In addition to simple searching, Bookmarks can dynamically refine search results with the user identifying users or other tags of interest to them.

Bookmarks can output bookmarks via standard feeds and provides an API so that third-party tools can integrate with it. As of Connections 2.0.1, the API can be used for:

 Searching bookmarks
 Getting a list of bookmark tags
 Getting a list of popular bookmarks
 Adding bookmarks to a Web page
 Adding a list of bookmarks to a Web page
 Adding popular bookmarks to a Web page
 Creating bookmarks
 Deleting bookmarks
 Retrieving bookmarks
 Updating bookmarks

Activities
Activities is a task management system which enables groups of people to easily collaborate on a task. Activities are structured in a nested tree hierarchy where entries, to-do items and sections branch off from the root activity.

Any non-section entity in an activity can contain rich-text and custom fields for files, links, text, people and dates. To-Do items can also have a due date and a person the To-Do is assigned to.

Wikis
Wikis are a new capability added to IBM Connections 2.5 which facilitate the collaborative creation of web content.  Wikis are collections of pages about a particular subject. Wiki members can edit or comment on the pages, or add their own pages. Teams can use wikis to create a central place to collaborate on a project.

Files
Files is a personal file-sharing service that is part of IBM Connections 2.5, used to upload, share, tag, recommend, and comment on files.

Communities
Communities enable ad hoc and planned collaboration around a project or area of interest. A Connections Community can have its own media gallery, event calendar, ideation, microblogging, blog, forums, bookmarks, activities, feeds, member list, Wiki and Files.

Blogs
Blogs provide blogging functionality for groups and individuals.

Forums
Forums is used for discussions. It was added as a component in 3.0, and was previously part of the Communities component.

Plugins
HCL Connections integrates into existing applications via plug-ins.  Out-of-the-box, the following plugins are available, most included as part of the license:
 HCL Notes
 HCL Sametime
 Microsoft Office including Word, PowerPoint, and Excel
 Microsoft Outlook
 Windows Explorer
 Microsoft SharePoint
 RIM BlackBerry
 Apple iPhone / iPad / iPod Touch
 Google Android Phones

Other integration with Microsoft SharePoint and Microsoft Office Communications Server has also been done.

ISVs have also integrated into the IBM Connections platform, such as Trilog Group to add Social Project Management for complex projects, ISW & Bunchball to add a gamification layer, Blogsy which serves as a native iPad blogging app for IBM Connections,

References

External links
 

Collaborative software
Content management systems
Document management systems
Portal software
2007 establishments in the United States
2019 mergers and acquisitions